Werner Delmes (28 September 1930 – 13 January 2022) was a German field hockey player who competed in the 1956 Summer Olympics and 1960 Summer Olympics. He was born in Cologne, Rhineland, Prussia, Germany. Delmes died in Cologne, North Rhine-Westphalia, on 13 January 2022, at the age of 91.

References

External links
 

1930 births
2022 deaths
German male field hockey players
Olympic field hockey players of the United Team of Germany
Field hockey players at the 1956 Summer Olympics
Field hockey players at the 1960 Summer Olympics
Olympic bronze medalists for the United Team of Germany
Olympic medalists in field hockey
Sportspeople from Cologne
Medalists at the 1956 Summer Olympics
20th-century German people